Sarah Fischer (born 9 November 2000) is an Austrian weightlifter. She is a three-time medalist at the European Weightlifting Championships. She also represented Austria at the 2020 Summer Olympics in Tokyo, Japan. Her brother is weightlifter David Fischer.

Career 

At the 2017 Youth World Weightlifting Championships held in Bangkok, Thailand, she won the silver medal in the women's +75 kg event. In that same year, at the 2017 European Junior & U23 Weightlifting Championships held in Durrës, Albania, she won the silver medal in the women's junior 90 kg event.

In 2018, she won the bronze medal in the women's 90 kg event at the Junior World Weightlifting Championships held in Tashkent, Uzbekistan.

In 2019, at the European Weightlifting Championships held in Batumi, Georgia, she won the bronze medal in the women's 87kg event. In that same year, she also won the silver medal in the women's junior 87kg event at the 2019 European Junior & U23 Weightlifting Championships in Bucharest, Romania.

In 2020, she won the bronze medal in the women's 87kg event at the Roma 2020 World Cup in Rome, Italy. In 2021, she competed in her event at the European Weightlifting Championships held in Moscow, Russia.

She represented Austria at the 2020 Summer Olympics in Tokyo, Japan. She finished in 10th place in the women's +87 kg event. At the 2021 European Junior & U23 Weightlifting Championships in Rovaniemi, Finland, she won the silver medal in her event.

She won the bronze medal in her event at the 2022 European Weightlifting Championships held in Tirana, Albania. She won the gold medal in her event at the 2022 European Junior & U23 Weightlifting Championships held in Durrës, Albania.

Achievements

References

External links 
 

2000 births
Living people
Place of birth missing (living people)
Austrian female weightlifters
European Weightlifting Championships medalists
Weightlifters at the 2020 Summer Olympics
Olympic weightlifters of Austria
21st-century Austrian women